Erie Canal Harbor (formerly Auditorium until September 1, 2003) is a Buffalo Metro Rail station located in the 100 block of Main Street (just north of Hanover and Scott Streets) next to the South Aud Block of Canalside in the Free Fare Zone, which allows passengers free travel between this station and Fountain Plaza station. Passengers continuing past Fountain Plaza are required to provide proof-of-payment. Unless there are events occurring at KeyBank Center, in which case Special Events station will be utilized, this is the southern terminus of Metro Rail. Since Erie Canal Harbor station serves as a terminal, immediately north is a double crossover. Erie Canal Harbor station is located close to Amtrak's Buffalo–Exchange Street station and the two stations are connected by a lit pathway beneath Interstate 190 with decorative cement and signage.

Bus routes
 6 Sycamore
 8 Main (outbound)
 24 Genesee (outbound)
 68 George Urban (outbound)

Notable places nearby
Erie Canal Harbor station is located near:
 Buffalo–Exchange Street station (Amtrak train station)
 Buffalo and Erie County Naval & Military Park
 Canalside District
 KeyBank Center (formerly First Niagara Center, HSBC Arena, Marine Midland Arena and Crossroads Arena)
 LECOM Harborcenter

See also
 List of Buffalo Metro Rail stations

References

Buffalo Metro Rail stations
Railway stations in the United States opened in 1984
1984 establishments in New York (state)